This is the list of all FC Nordsjælland's European matches.

Results

Summary

By competition

Source: UEFA.com, Last updated on 22 August 2018Pld = Matches played; W = Matches won; D = Matches drawn; L = Matches lost; GF = Goals for; GA = Goals against; GD = Goal Difference. Defunct competitions indicated in italics.

By ground

Last updated: 22 August 2018

UEFA club coefficient ranking

Current
As of 01.07.2018, Source:

Rankings since 2006

Source:

References

FC Nordsjælland
Danish football clubs in international competitions